The Harry Gibbons Migratory Bird Sanctuary is a migratory bird sanctuary in Kivalliq Region, Nunavut, Canada.  It is located in western Southampton Island in the area of the Boas River and Bay of Gods Mercy.

The Sanctuary was established 1 January 1959, and consisting of 149,500 hectares,. Of its  in overall size,  is a marine area with marine, intertidal, and subtidal components.

The sanctuary was named after Harry Gibbons Ohnainewk (c. 1900–1954), a local Inuit hunter and guide whose journals provided valuable weather data, especially on wind.

Other designations

Along with its wetlands, the Boas River is a Canadian Important Bird Area (site #NU022). The Harry Gibbons MBS takes up the western portion of the IBA.

References

Bird sanctuaries of Kivalliq Region
Important Bird Areas of Kivalliq Region
Migratory Bird Sanctuaries of Canada